The Anda Monument, often erroneously referred to as the Anda Circle after the roundabout it is currently located, is an obelisk monument situated in the boundary of Intramuros and Port Area in central Manila, Philippines. It was erected in honor of Simón de Anda y Salazar, the Governor General of the Philippines from 1770 to 1776. The Anda Circle, the roundabout, is an interchange system at the junction of Bonifacio Drive, Mel Lopez Boulevard, Andres Soriano Avenue (formerly Calle Aduana), and Roberto Oca Street.

History

The original monument was erected in 1871 near the Pasig River under the order of Governor General Carlos Maria de la Torre as a form of public gratitude to Simón de Anda for his initiative in the resistance against the British occupation of Manila which began in 1762. It was heavily damaged during World War II when the Japanese occupied Manila.

After the war, the monument was moved to its present location at the rotunda and was retransformed into a monument circle. President Carlos P. Garcia recounted Anda's heroism and defense of Filipinos against Spanish abuses in his turn over speech on June 8, 1957.

The Anda Monument had previously shown signs of vandalism.

On October 7, 2020, the newly rehabilitated Anda Circle was unveiled. The monument was repainted with the same color as the original. Multi-colored lights and a fountain were also installed. The fountain was installed in a  diameter pool and the 222 RGB LED lamps light up the water in various colors.

Planned relocation
In September 2014, the Department of Public Works and Highways (DPWH) announced its plan to dismantle the Anda Monument and convert the roundabout into a regular intersection to ease traffic congestion along Bonifacio Drive, the main thoroughfare for trucks going to and from the Port of Manila. The highways department also recommended relocating the monument to protect it from damage from possible accidents. The plan was accepted by the National Historical Commission and coordinated with the department for its transfer back to its original location in Plaza Maestranza within Intramuros near the Pasig River. However, the moving of the monument did not push through.

In February 2016, the DPWH said that the plan was cancelled, citing opposition from heritage conservationists led by the National Commission for Culture and the Arts and Senator Pia Cayetano to such plans.

Gallery

References

Buildings and structures in Intramuros
Buildings and structures in Port Area, Manila
Monuments and memorials in Metro Manila